The Fargo Training School was founded as a private school initially known as the Fargo Agricultural School by Dr. Floyd Brown. It was acquired by the state in 1949 and was operated as an educational facility for educating delinquent African American girls in Fargo, Arkansas.  The school was operated from 1949 until it was closed in 1968 as part of a court-mandated integration of the state's juvenile facility.   

The school's surviving campus was listed on the National Register of Historic Places in 2010.  It is one of the state's best-preserved campuses of its type from the segregation era.  The campus includes six surviving buildings, including one that now houses the Floyd Brown Museum, an International-style building constructed in 1958.

See also
National Register of Historic Places listings in Monroe County, Arkansas

References

Buildings and structures completed in 1960
Buildings and structures in Monroe County, Arkansas
Defunct schools in Arkansas
Museums in Monroe County, Arkansas
Historic districts on the National Register of Historic Places in Arkansas
History museums in Arkansas
National Register of Historic Places in Monroe County, Arkansas